Huitepec is the mountain towering to the west of San Cristóbal de las Casas, Chiapas, in southern Mexico. It is a volcano that was active most recently about 100 years ago and is covered in cloud forest. It is about 2700 meters high, making it one of the highest peaks of the Chiapas Highlands. It is home to several endemic bird species, such as the motmot Aspatha gularis and the bearded screech-owl. On its eastern flank the site of Santa Anita, Chiapas is located. A big part of the mountain has been declared a community reserve by the Zapatista Junta de Buen Gobierno. On its northern flank, the NGO Pronatura has a privately owned nature reserve.

External links
 

Landforms of Chiapas
Mountains of Mexico
Volcanoes of Chiapas
Pleistocene lava domes
Chiapas Highlands
Central American pine–oak forests